Ray Bamford (15 September 1915 – 29 September 1994) was an  Australian rules footballer who played with North Melbourne and Geelong in the Victorian Football League (VFL).

Notes

External links 

1915 births
1994 deaths
Australian rules footballers from Victoria (Australia)
North Melbourne Football Club players
Geelong Football Club players
Shepparton Football Club players